GHS Trikarpur, also known as GVHSS Trikarpur and GHS Trikaripur, is a government vocational higher secondary school in Thrikaripur, Kerala. The school has upper primary divisions, secondary divisions and higher secondary divisions. It was opened in the 1960s.

References 

Schools in Kasaragod district